The ultramarine kingfisher (Todiramphus leucopygius) is a species of bird in the family Alcedinidae.

Habitat 
It is found on Bougainville Island and the Solomon Islands.
Its natural habitat is subtropical or tropical moist lowland forests.

References

ultramarine kingfisher
Birds of Bougainville Island
Birds of the Solomon Islands
ultramarine kingfisher
Taxonomy articles created by Polbot